Vatul is a village in the State of Maharashtra in India with a population 1349-Male-657-Females-692 (census 2011). 339 houses are in Vatul village. Child population - 124-Male-64-Female-60. Schedule Caste - 91-Male-45-Female-46. Schedule Tribe - 3-Male-2-Female-1. Literacy - 85.39%-Male-94.60%-Female-76.74%. The closest tourism destination to Vatul is Ratnagiri. Other close by tourism destinations include Panhala, Dajipur and Kunkeshwar. The nearest major railway station to Vatul is Ratnagiri (RN) which is at a distance of 23.3 kilometres. The nearest airport is at Goa which is at a distance of 154 kilometres.

Climate
Vatul has distinct seasons, with significant variations in temperature throughout the year. October, March, April and May are the hottest months of the year in Vatul. The temperatures reach their highest in the month of October. November, January, February are the pleasant months of the year, with temperatures reaching their lowest in November. It rains heavily in the month of July, August and September.

Houses
In Vatul, houses are nestled amidst the trees and the paddy fields. There is abundant land available to build upon and yet, the houses lie snugly next to each other. The roofs are built in timber understructure with mangalore tiles. The walls are in brick and verandahs are created with brick arches that offer structural support. The plan of the house is primarily square. The square tiled roof is seen as a common element throughout the Vatul.

Temples
 Swayambhu Mahadeo Mandir
 Adhisthi Devi & Ravalnath Mandir
 Pavana Devi & Jakadevi Mandir
 Vitthal Rukmini tample at kadekar vadi
 Shri Dev Gango Akari Mandir
 Shantidutt BUDHA VIHAR at WALANJU VADI

Schools and colleges
AADARSH VIDYAMANDIR & Jr.College

Languages spoken
Most of the populace speaks Marathi and Hindi.  English is spoken by some, and a few people are fluent in English.

Cooperative Society
Vatul Gram Seva Sangh Sahakari Patpedi Ltd. Estd. 1945 Reg.No.9028
(वाटुळ ग्राम सेवा संघ सहकारी पतपेढी मर्यादीत)

External links
Vatul Homepage

Villages in Ratnagiri district